Bryotropha plantariella is a moth of the family Gelechiidae. It is found in Norway, Sweden, Finland, north-eastern Germany, Lithuania, Latvia, Estonia, Poland, Belarus, Russia (including Siberia) and North America. Records from Austria, the Czech Republic and Slovakia need confirmation.

The wingspan is 11–13 mm for males and 11–12 mm for females. The forewings are dark ochreous grey to brown. The hindwings are pale grey. Females are similar to males, but somewhat darker. Adults have been recorded on wing from May to July.

The larvae possibly feed on Sphagnum species.

References

Moths described in 1848
plantariella
Moths of Europe
Moths of Asia
Moths of North America